The third season of the reality television series Basketball Wives LA aired on VH1 from February 17, 2014 until April 28, 2014. It follows the lives of a group of women who have all been somehow romantically linked to professional basketball players.

It was executively produced by Pam Healey, Sean Rankine, Amanda Scott, Shaunie O'Neal, Mark Seliga, and Lisa Shannon.

Production
Basketball Wives LA was revealed on June 20, 2011, with Kimsha Artest, Gloria Govan, Laura Govan, Jackie Christie and Imani Showalter as the cast. Malaysia Pargo and Draya Michele were announced as part of the cast in the series' July 2011 press release. Kimsha Artest stopped showing up for filming because she did not agree with the "shenanigans and drama", which explains why she was not featured in more than one episode. Tanya Williams was to be the eighth official "wife" but left the series after two episodes. The series premiered on August 29, 2011, to 1.81 million viewers.

The third season of Basketball Wives LA was aired on February 17, 2014. Creator of the series, Shaunie O'Neal, announced that the series would be receiving a major update for the third season. Filming began in August 2013, with new members added to the mix. Gloria Govan Barnes and her sister Laura Govan confirmed their exit with their own series possibly in the works. Brooke Bailey confirmed via Twitter that she would also not return. British Williams, Brandi Maxiell, and Sundy Carter joined the cast. The third-season premiere acquired 1.95 million viewers making it the highest rated premiere for the LA franchise and a 1.0 in the adults 18–49 rating demographic. This season is also the first and only of the series to reach over 2 million viewers for six consecutive weeks

Cast

Main
Draya Michele: Girlfriend of Orlando Scandrick
Sundy Carter: Jackie's friend
Malaysia Pargo: Wife of Jannero Pargo
Brandi Maxiell: Wife of Jason Maxiell
Brittish Williams: Fiancée of Lorenzo Gordon
Jackie Christie: Wife of Doug Christie

Recurring
Chantel Christie: Jackie's daughter
Lorenzo Gordon: Free Agent; Brittish's fiancee

Episodes

References

2014 American television seasons
Basketball Wives